Giovanni Migliara (October 15, 1785 in Alessandria – April 18, 1837 in Milan), was a nobleman and Italian painter active at the beginning of the 19th century, painting vedute and history paintings.

Biography 
Born to artisan parents of limited means, he was apprenticed to the sculptor Giuseppe Maria Bonzanigo. He also studied at the Brera Academy with Giocondo Albertolli and began his career as a set designer in the Teatro Carcano (1804) and La Scala (1805 - 1809), under the direction of Alessandro Sanquirico.

Due to a serious lung disorder, he stopped working for a time. Then, from 1810, he began painting again (mostly miniatures) in watercolours and oils on different media, (canvas, silk, and ivory). He made his return to the art world with an exhibition of four cityscapes at the Brera Academy in 1812.

While the Milanese painting scene was dominated by neoclassic painters Andrea Appiani and Luigi Sabatelli, Giovanni Migliara stayed with the historical themes and medieval subtlety of romanticism. With his improved technique, his choice of subjects, and the quality of his work, he became a favorite of the Milanese aristocracy. In 1822, he was named Professor at the Brera Academy and, in 1833, he was named court painter for King Charles Albert of Sardinia, after being presented with the Civil Order of Savoy.

As well as his historical canvases, he produced a number of church interiors in a topographical style. He was also the author of Trattato di geometria descrittiva, published in 1813.

Among his pupils were Giovanni Renica of Brescia, Luigi Bisi, and Federico Moja.

Selected paintings

Works 

 View of Campo San Giovanni e Paolo with the facade of the School of San Marco,
 Vedute from Rialto Bridge in Venice.
 Interior of the Church of San Lorenzo, Milan Museum.
 Via Fatabene Fratelli (1830), Milan.
 Portico of the Church of San Lorenzo (v.1814), Milan.
 Vestibule of a Convent (1833), Alexandria Art Gallery.
 Entrance to the Château de Plessis de la Tour (1833), Civic Modern Art Gallery, Turin.
 Confalonieri e Pellico alla applicazione del metodo Lancaster-Bell di mutuo insegnament, Museum of the Risorgimento (Turin)

Bibliography 
 Elena Lissoni, Giovanni Migliara, online catalogue Artgate by Fondazione Cariplo, 2010, CC BY-SA.

References

External links 

 

People from Alessandria
18th-century Italian painters
Italian male painters
19th-century Italian painters
Painters from Milan
1785 births
1837 deaths
Academic staff of Brera Academy
Italian vedutisti
19th-century Italian male artists
18th-century Italian male artists